The municipalities of Iceland are local administrative areas in Iceland that provide a number of services to their inhabitants such as kindergartens, elementary schools, waste management, social services, public housing, public transportation, services to senior citizens and disabled people. They also govern zoning and can voluntarily take on additional functions if they have the budget for it. The autonomy of municipalities over their own matters is guaranteed by the Icelandic constitution.

History

The origin of the municipalities can be traced back to the commonwealth period in the 10th century when rural communities were organized into communes (hreppar ) with the main purpose of providing help for the poorest individuals in society. When urbanization began in Iceland during the 18th and 19th centuries, several independent townships (kaupstaðir ) were created. The role of municipalities was further formalized during the 20th century and by the end of the century there was no longer any official distinction between urban and rural municipalities. 

The trend in recent years has been to transfer more functions and power from the state to the municipalities. This has called for larger municipalities. The government encourages municipalities to merge but has taken a different approach to the issue than governments in other Nordic countries where forced amalgamation is regularly carried out (such as the municipal reform in Denmark that took effect in 2007). Instead, the process is voluntary. Municipalities negotiate possible mergers among themselves, and any merger must first receive approval from the relevant municipality's constituent voting electorate in a referendum. A similar approach is used by the Faroese government. However, municipalities having a population of below 50 may be forced to merge.

The number of municipalities peaked in the mid-20th century. There were 229 of them in 1950. By 1995, their number had been reduced to 170. In the year 2000, only 124 municipalities remained in Iceland, and since 2022 there are 64.

Government
The municipalities are governed by municipal councils which are directly elected every four years. Municipal elections were last held on 14 May 2022. The sizes of these councils vary from five members in the smallest municipalities to fifteen in the largest one. Most municipalities except for the very small ones hire an executive manager who may or may not be a member of the municipal council. These managers are usually referred to as mayors (bæjarstjóri  or borgarstjóri ) in the mostly urban municipalities but "municipal manager" (sveitarstjóri ) in the rural or mixed municipalities. It is common for these executive managers to be professionally hired and politically independent.

List of municipalities

History
Over the years, the number of municipalities in Iceland changed from 229 in 1953 to 64 in 2022:
14 May 2022 (reduced to 64)
Skútustaðahreppur merged with Þingeyjarsveit.
Stykkishólmsbær and Helgafellssveit merged (name pending).
Svalbarðshreppur merged with Langanesbyggð.
Akrahreppur merged with Skagafjörður.
Blönduósbær and Húnavatnshreppur merged to form Húnabyggð
17 February 2020 (reduced to 69)
Borgarfjarðarhreppur, Djúpavogshreppur, Fljótsdalshérað, and Seyðisfjarðarkaupstaður merged to form Múlaþing.
24 January 2019
Akureyrarkaupstaður renamed into Akureyrarbær.
7 January 2019
Sandgerði/Garður renamed into Suðurnesjabær.
26 May 2018 (reduced to 72)
Breiðdalshreppur merged with Fjarðabyggð.
Sandgerði and Garður merged to form Sandgerði/Garður.
13 August 2013
Seltjarnarneskaupstaður renamed into Seltjarnarnesbær.
1 January 2013 (reduced to 74)
Álftanes merged with Garðabær.
1 January 2012 (reduced to 75)
Bæjarhreppur merged with Húnaþing vestra
11 June 2010 (reduced to 76)
Arnarneshreppur merged with Hörgárbyggð.
1 June 2009 (reduced to 77)
Grímseyjarhreppur merged with Akureyrarkaupstaður.
15 July 2008 (reduced to 78)
Aðaldælahreppur merged with Þingeyjarsveit.
12 September 2007
Höfðahreppur renamed into Skagaströnd.
8 April 2006 (reduced to 79)
Þórshafnarhreppur and Skeggjastaðahreppur merged to form Langanesbyggð.
11 March 2006 (reduced to 80)
Áshreppur merged with Húnavatnshreppur.
Hólmavíkurhreppur and Broddaneshreppur merged to form Strandabyggð.
20 February 2006 (reduced to 82)
Saurbæjarhreppur merged with Dalabyggð.
11 February 2006 (reduced to 83)
 Gaulverjabæjarhreppur, Hraungerðishreppur, and Villingaholtshreppur merged to form Flóahreppur.
28 January 2006 (reduced to 85)
Ólafsfjarðarbær and Siglufjarðarkaupstaður merged to form Fjallabyggð.
21 January 2006 (reduced to 86)
Húsavíkurbær, Kelduneshreppur, Öxarfjarðarhreppur, and Raufarhafnarhreppur merged to form Norðurþing.
10 January 2006
Vatnsleysustrandarhreppur renamed into Vogar.
8 October 2005 (reduced to 89)
Mjóafjarðarhreppur, Fáskrúðsfjarðarhreppur, and Austurbyggð merged with Fjarðabyggð.
23 April 2005 (reduced to 92)
Borgarfjarðarsveit, Hvítársíðuhreppur, and Kolbeinsstaðahreppur merged with Borgarbyggð.
20 November 2004 (reduced to 95)
Bólstaðarhlíðarhreppur, Sveinsstaðarhreppur, Svínavatnshreppur, and Torfalækjarhreppur merged to form Húnavatnshreppur.
Hvalfjarðarstrandarhreppur, Innri-Akraneshreppur, Leirár- og Melahreppur, and Skilmannahreppur merged to form Hvalfjarðarsveit.
1 November 2004 (reduced to 101)
Austur-Hérað, Fellahreppur, and Norður-Hérað merged to form Fljótsdalshérað.
1 August 2004 (reduced to 103)
Hríseyjarhreppur merged with Akureyrarkaupstaður.
17 June 2004
Bessastaðahreppur renamed into Álftanes.
28 January 2004
Gerðahreppur renamed into Garður.
10 May 2003 (reduced to 104)
Stöðvarhreppur and Búðahreppur merged to form Austurbyggð.
9 June 2002 (reduced to 105)
Kirkjubólshreppur merged with Hólmavíkurhreppur.
16 March 2002 (reduced to 106)
Holta- og Landsveit, Djúpárhreppur, and Rangárvallahreppur merged to form Rangárþing ytra.
12 March 2002 (reduced to 108)
Húsavíkurkaupstaður and Reykjahreppur merged to form Húsavíkurbær.
11 February 2002 (reduced to 109)
Þingvallahreppur, Laugardalshreppur, and Biskupstungnahreppur merged to form Bláskógabyggð.
21 January 2002 (reduced to 111)
Gnúpverjahreppur and Skeiðahreppur merged to form Skeiða- og Gnúpverjahreppur
31 December 2001 (reduced to 112)
Vindhælishreppur merged with Skagabyggð.
20 November 2001 (reduced to 113)
Austur-Eyjafjallahreppur, Vestur-Eyjafjallahreppur, Austur-Landeyjahreppur, Vestur-Landeyjahreppur, Fljótshlíðarhreppur, and Hvolhreppur merged to form Rangárþing eystra.
15 November 2001 (reduced to 118)
Hálshreppur, Ljósavatnshreppur, Bárðdælahreppur, and Reykdælahreppur merged to form Þingeyjarsveit.
26 April 2001 (reduced to 121)
Engihlíðarhreppur merged with Blönduósbær.
1 January 2001 (reduced to 122)
Skriðuhreppur, Öxnadalshreppur, and Glæsibæjarhreppur merged to form Hörgárbyggð.
7 June 1998 (reduced to 124)
Kjalarneshreppur merged with Reykjavíkurborg.
Skriðdalshreppur, Vallahreppur, Egilsstaðabær, Eiðahreppur, and Hjaltastaðarhreppur merged to form Austur-Hérað.
Dalvíkurkaupstaður, Svarfaðardalshreppur, and Árskógshreppur merged to form Dalvíkurbyggð.
Neskaupstaður, Eskifjarðarkaupstaður and Reyðarfjarðarhreppur merged to form Fjarðabyggð.
Staðarhreppur, Fremri Torfustaðahreppur, Ytri Torfustaðahreppur, Hvammstangahreppur, Kirkjuhvammshreppur, Þverárhreppur, and Þorkelshólshreppur merged to form Húnaþing vestra.
Selfosskaupstaður, Stokkseyrarhreppur, Eyrarbakkahreppur, and Sandvíkurhreppur merged to form Árborg.
Lundarreykjardalshreppur, Reykholtsdalshreppur, Hálsahreppur, and Andakílshreppur merged to form Borgarfjarðarsveit.
6 June 1998 (reduced to 145)
Sauðárkrókskaupstaður, Skefilsstaðahreppur, Skarðshreppur, Staðarhreppur, Seyluhreppur, Lýtingsstaðahreppur, Rípurhreppur, Viðvíkurhreppur, Hólahreppur, Hofshreppur, and Fljótahreppur merged to form Skagafjörður.
Bæjarhreppur, Borgarhafnarhreppur, Hofshreppur, and Hornafjarðarbær merged to form Hornafjörður. 
1 June 1998 (reduced to 155)
Grímsneshreppur and Grafningshreppur merged to form Grímsnes- og Grafningshreppur.
14 February 1998 (reduced to 158)
Þverárhlíðarhreppur, Borgarhreppur, and Álftaneshreppur merged with Borgarbyggð.
1 January 1998 (reduced to 161)
Skógarstrandarhreppur merged with Dalabyggð.
27 December 1997 (reduced to 163)
Hlíðarhreppur, Jökuldalshreppur, and Tunguhreppur merged to form Norður-Hérað. 
1 June 1996 (reduced to 165)
Ísafjarðarkaupstaður, Þingeyrarhreppur, Mýrahreppur, Mosvallahreppur, Flateyrarhreppur, and Suðureyrarhreppur merged to form Ísafjarðarbær.
19 April 1995 (increased to 170)
Helgafellssveit split from Stykkishólmur.
1 January 1995 (reduced to 169)
Ögurhreppur and Reykjarfjarðarhreppur merged with Súðavíkurhreppur.
12 June 1994 (reduced to 171)
Höfn, Nesjahreppur, and Mýrahreppur merged to form Hornafjarðarbær.
11 June 1994 (reduced to 173)
Suðurdalahreppur, Haukadalshreppur, Laxárdalshreppur, Hvammshreppur, Fellsstrandarhreppur, and Skarðshreppur merged to form Dalabyggð.
Staðarsveit, Breiðuvíkurhreppur, Neshreppur utan Ennis, and Ólafsvíkurbær merged to form Snæfellsbær.
Hafnahreppur, Keflavíkurbær, and Njarðvíkurbær merged to form Reykjanesbær.
Norðfjarðarhreppur merged with Neskaupstaður.
Barðastrandarhreppur, Rauðasandshreppur, Patrekshreppur, and Bíldudalshreppur merged to form Vesturbyggð.
Sauðaneshreppur merged with Þórshafnarhreppur.
Norðurárdalshreppur, Stafholtstungnahreppur, Borgarnesbær, and Hraunhreppur merged to form Borgarbyggð.
Eyjarhreppur and Miklaholtshreppur merged to form Eyja- og Miklaholtshreppur.
Nauteyrarhreppur í Norður-Ísafjarðarsýslu and Hólmavíkurhreppur í Strandasýslu merged to form Hólmavíkurhreppur.
Snæfjallahreppur í Norður-Ísafjarðarsýslu merged with Ísafjarðarkaupstaður.
Helgafellssveit merged with Stykkishólmur.
1 January 1994 (reduced to 195)
Fjallahreppur merged with Öxarfjarðarhreppur.
1 July 1993 (reduced to 196)
Landmannahreppur and Holtahreppur merged to form Holta- og Landsveit.
1 October 1992 (reduced to 197)
Beruneshreppur, Búlandshreppur, and Geithellnahreppur merged to form Djúpavogshreppur.
1 January 1992 (reduced to 199)
Hörðudalshreppur merged with Miðdalahreppur to form Suðurdalahreppur.
Fellshreppur í Strandasýslu merged with Óspakseyrarhreppur to form Broddaneshreppur.
17 February 1991 (reduced to 201)
Presthólahreppur merged with Öxarfjarðarhreppur.
1 January 1991 (reduced to 202)
Hrafnagilshreppur, Saurbæjarhreppur, and Öngulsstaðahreppur merged to form Eyjafjarðarsveit.
10 June 1990 (reduced to 204)
Hofsóshreppur and Fellshreppur merged with Hofshreppur.
Hörglandshreppur, Kirkjubæjarhreppur, Skaftártunguhreppur, Leiðvallahreppur, and Álftavershreppur merged to form Skaftárhreppur.
1 April 1990 (reduced to 210)
Fróðárhreppur merged with Ólafsvíkurkaupstaður.
Auðkúluhreppur merged with Þingeyrarhreppur.
Seyðisfjarðarhreppur merged with Seyðisfjarðarkaupstaður.
1 January 1989 (reduced to 213)
Selvogshreppur merged with Ölfushreppur.
1 April 1988 (reduced to 214)
Haganeshreppur merged with Holtshreppur to form Fljótahreppur.
1 January 1988 (reduced to 215)
Helgustaðahreppur merged with Eskifjarðarkaupstaður.
4 July 1987 (reduced to 216)
Geiradalshreppur, Gufudalshreppur, Múlahreppur, and Flateyjarhreppur merged with Reykhólahreppur.
1 July 1987 (reduced to 220)
Ketildalahreppur merged with Suðurfjarðarhreppur to form Bíldudalshreppur.
1 January 1987 (reduced to 221)
Hrófbergshreppur merged with Hólmavíkurhreppur.
30 July 1986 (reduced to 222)
Klofningshreppur merged with Fellsstrandarhreppur.
1984 (reduced to 223)
Dyrhólahreppur merged with Hvammshreppur to form Mýrdalshreppur.
1972 (reduced to 224)
Flateyjarhreppur merged with Hálshreppur.
 Loðmundarfjarðarhreppur merged with Borgarfjarðarhreppur.
1971 (reduced to 226)
 Eyrarhreppur merged with Ísafjarðarkaupstaður.
1 January  1964 (reduced to 227)
Grunnavíkurhreppur merged with Snæfjallahreppur.
1953 (229 municipalities reduced to 228)
Sléttuhreppur is deserted and included in Ísafjarðarkaupstaður, but not officially merged until 1995.

See also
List of cities and towns in Iceland
Constituencies of Iceland
List of the most populated municipalities in the Nordic countries

References

External links
Maps of the municipalities

 
Subdivisions of Iceland
Iceland
Iceland, Municipalities
Iceland 2
Municipalities, Iceland
Iceland geography-related lists